The DePauw Tigers football team is the American football program for DePauw University, which began in 1884. DePauw has the 20th most victories in Division III history. The Tigers have been the co-champions of the Southern Collegiate Athletic Conference four times (2000, 2005, 2009 and 2010).  In addition, they won two championships (1990, 1996) during their membership in the Heartland Collegiate Athletic Conference and five titles (1928, 1930, 1931, 1933 and 1943) in the Indiana Intercollegiate Conference.

In 1933, head coach Ray Neal led the DePauw Tigers football team to an unbeaten, untied, and unscored opening season. The Tigers compiled a 7–0 record and outscored their opponents 136–0. Neal nearly duplicated this feat in 1943, but DePauw, 5–0–1, finished the season with one scoreless tie and six points allowed in a different game. The only points surrendered that season were in a 39–6 victory over Indiana State and the only non-win was a 0–0 tie against Oberlin. The Tigers outscored their opponents, 206–6.

The Tigers have a blood feud with "nearby" Wabash College. Its most visible clash is the annual Monon Bell game.

Playoff appearances

NCAA Division III
The Tigers have appeared in the Division III playoffs four times, with an overall record of 1–4.

References

 
American football teams established in 1884
1884 establishments in Indiana